Berginus is a genus of hairy fungus beetles in the family Mycetophagidae. There are at least three described species in Berginus.

Species
These three species belong to the genus Berginus.
 Berginus bahamicus Casey, 1900
 Berginus nigricolor Champion, 1913
 Berginus pumilus LeConte, 1863

References

Further reading

 
 
 
 
 
 
 

Tenebrionoidea